Alberto Cianca (1884–1966) was an Italian journalist and anti-fascist politician. He edited several significant publications, including Il Mondo, and served in the Parliament and Senate.

Early life and education
Cianca was born in Rome on 1 January 1884. He had a bachelor's degree in law.

Career
He started his career as a journalist and worked as a parliamentary reporter for the Rome-based newspaper La Tribuna. Then he worked for Secolo in Milan and later, he served as the editor-in-chief of Il Messaggero in Roma from which he resigned in 1921. Then he worked for L'Ora.

He was the director of Il Mondo from its start in 1922 to its closure in 1926. The paper was the most significant opposition publication against Fascist government of Benito Mussolini. Cianca also edited another anti-fascist publication, Il Becco Giallo, a weekly satirical magazine.

Exile
In 1927 Cianca left Italy to avoid from being arrested and settled in Paris. There he edited some publications and involved in the establishment of an anti-Fascist resistance movement, Giustizia e Libertà. In the establishment of the Giustizia e Libertà he collaborated with Carlo Rosselli, Nello Rosselli, Emilio Lussu, Alberto Tarchiani, Fausto Nitti and Gaetano Salvemini. Cianca managed to resume the publication of Il Becco Giallo in Paris, and also, he and Carlo Rosselli edited a weekly publication of Giustizia e Libertà which was also entitled Giustizia e Libertà. In fact, Rosselli was the editor of the weekly between 1934 and his death in 1937, and Cianca succeeded him in the post.

When World War II broke out and France was occupied by Nazi German forces Cianca took refuge in the United States. In 1940 he involved in the establishment of the Mazzini Society in New York City which was among the antifascist organizations founded by Italian political exiles in the United States. Cianca and his close ally Alberto Tarchiani were very active in the society dealing with its administrative operations. Cianca was also named the president of the society's New York branch. Following the end of the Fascist rule in Italy Cianca and other Italian exiles returned to Italy which led to the end of the Mazzini Society.

Later years and death
Upon his return to Italy Cianca became the leader of the Action Party. He was a member of the National Council and a minister in the first cabinet of Alcide De Gasperi. He was among the few elected members of the Action Party to the Constituent Assembly in 1946 and also, the last secretary of the Action Party before its closure. Then Cianca joined the Italian Socialist Party and was elected senator on its lists in the elections in 1953 and 1958. 

Cianca served several times as the president of the board of arbitrators of Italian journalists. He died in Rome on 8 January 1966.

References

External links

20th-century Italian journalists
1884 births
1966 deaths
Action Party (Italy) politicians
Government ministers of Italy
Italian expatriates in France
Italian expatriates in the United States
Italian magazine editors
Italian newspaper editors
Italian Socialist Party politicians
Members of the National Council (Italy)
Members of Giustizia e Libertà
Senators of Legislature II of Italy
Senators of Legislature III of Italy
Politicians from Rome